Streptomyces phaeoluteigriseus is a bacterium species from the genus of Streptomyces which has been isolated from soil.

See also 
 List of Streptomyces species

References

Further reading

External links
Type strain of Streptomyces phaeoluteigriseus at BacDive -  the Bacterial Diversity Metadatabase	

phaeoluteigriseus
Bacteria described in 2008